Justin Gimelstob and Graydon Oliver won the doubles tennis matches in the final 5–7, 6–4, 6–4, against Yves Allegro and Roger Federer

Seeds

Draw

Draw

References

Doubles
Thailand Open - Doubles
 in Thai tennis